Oscar Erik Olof Hedman (born April 21, 1986) is a Swedish former professional ice hockey defenceman, who last played for Modo Hockey in the HockeyAllsvenskan (Allsv). Hedman made his debut in Elitserien at age 17, he quickly established himself in the league, and in 2007 he won the Swedish Championship with Modo. He is the older brother of Victor Hedman.

Playing career 
After a successful junior career, where he was a prominent part of Modo's J18- and J20-team, Hedman made his Elitserien debut for Modo in 2003 at the age of 17. After the season, he was drafted 132nd overall by the Washington Capitals in the 2004 NHL Entry Draft. Hedman was a cornerstone in Modo's 2007 championship winning team. Hedman suffered a concussion after being hit by Mika Pyörälä seven seconds into a game between Modo and archrival Timrå IK on November 26, 2007. The hit struck Hedman unfortunate and he remained lying on the ice, paramedics equipped Hedman with a cervical collar and he was taken to a local hospital by ambulance. Hedman has improved his point totals for five consecutive seasons in Elitserien.

On March 27, 2008, Hedman signed a two-year contract with Frölunda HC.

International play
Hedman played for Sweden at the 2004 IIHF World U18 Championships, the 2005 and 2006 World Junior Ice Hockey Championships where he became Sweden's leading scorer among defencemen with one goal and three assists.

Career statistics

Regular season and playoffs

International

References

External links

1986 births
Living people
People from Örnsköldsvik Municipality
Frölunda HC players
Modo Hockey players
Swedish ice hockey defencemen
Timrå IK players
Washington Capitals draft picks
Sportspeople from Västernorrland County